Zephyrarchaea janineae is a species of spider of the family Archaeidae. The Latin species name was chosen to honor Janine Wojcieszek who helped in discovering the first live specimens of the species in 2006. Zephyrarchaea janineae is endemic to the South West Region in Western Australia.

References

Archaeidae
Spiders described in 2012
Spiders of Australia
Endemic fauna of Australia